The Drakenstein mountain opposite Simonsberg Mountain named after ex military man and Colonial administrator of the Dutch East India Company Hendrik Adriaan van Rheede tot Drakenstein is part of the Cape Fold Belt and are in the Western Cape province of South Africa.

History 
Both the mountain and the valley at its foot Groot Drakenstein were named in honour of Hendrik who visited the Cape as Commissioner-General in 1685; Drakenstein (modern spelling usually Drakestein) was the name of his estate in the Netherlands.

Geography 
They actually comprise two separate ranges, the Klein Drakenstein and Groot Drakenstein Mountains. The former located just to the east of Paarl being punctuated by the Huguenot Tunnel on the N1 highway and Du Toitskloof Pass as the R101 route. The latter is much taller and is located south of Franschhoek and Stellenbosch, with Victoria Peak ( as its highest point.

Most vegetation is of the Cape Floral Kingdom biome, and the primary rocks are of the Table Mountain Sandstone group of the Cape Supergroup. The region falls within the Mediterranean climatic zone, with cool, wet winters, with snow on the higher elevations and warm, dry summers. The one peak facing Boschendal wine farm is named devils tooth for its big tooth look. British singer and songwriter Lily Allen shot the Air Balloon (song) at the foot of the mountain at an unused castle (perfect for movies, photography, in her case music videos). The mountain is mainly untouched yet there is foothpaths crossing the baboon infested mountain, with an apex predator the Cape leopard roaming the mountains and surrounding farms. For the hiking enthusiasts a trail with camping cabins runs all the way to Hermanus.

See also
 Wildlife of South Africa
 Southern Africa

References

 
Mountain ranges of the Western Cape